Velociraptorichnus is an ichnogenus of dinosaur footprint. In 2016 based on the 10 cm (0.33 ft) long footprint the animal's size was estimated at 1.2-1.55 meters (3.9–5 ft) and 3.9-5.6 kg (8.6-12.3 lbs).

See also

 List of dinosaur ichnogenera

References

Dinosaur trace fossils
Theropods